Mieczysław Marian Klimaszewski (26 July 1908 in Stanisławów – 27 November 1995 in Kraków) was a Polish geographer, geomorphologist and politician.

In June 1965 he was elected a member of the Polish Council of State. He was the deputy chairman of the Council from 1967–1972. As deputy chairman of the Council of State, he represented Poland at the 2,500 year celebration of the Persian Empire.

Klimaszewski was awarded honorary doctorates from several Universities, including those of Jena, Kyiv and Bratislava and the University of Silesia in Katowice.

He also received the Order of Polonia Restituta in several grades (Grand Cross, Commander with Star, and Officer) and the Order of the Banner of Labour, 1st class (received twice), and the Commemorative Medal of the 2500th Anniversary of the founding of the Persian Empire (14/10/1971).

References 

1908 births
1995 deaths
People from Ivano-Frankivsk
Jagiellonian University alumni
Polish geomorphologists
Polish geographers
Grand Crosses of the Order of Polonia Restituta
Recipients of the Order of the Banner of Work
Rectors of the Jagiellonian University
20th-century geographers
Members of the Royal Swedish Academy of Sciences